Jiménez is a patronymic surname of Iberian origin, first appearing in the Basque lands.

Jiménez is a patronymic construction from the modern-styled given name Jimeno, plus the Spanish suffix -ez, representing 'son of' Jimeno. The root appears to stem from Basque semen ('son'), attested in Aquitanian inscriptions as Sembeconnis and like forms. The patronymic appears in the 10th century Latin Códice de Roda genealogies as Scemenonis.

Variants of the surname include Jimenes, Ximénez/Ximenes, Giménez/Gimenes, Chiménez, Chimenes, Seménez, Semenes, Ximenis or Eiximenis in Catalonia, in Sicilian Scimemi or Scimeni and the Neapolitan Chimenz or Chimenez. In Spanish orthography, the variations of Jiménez that end with a z are written with an acute accent on the second syllable. In English, all variations are commonly written without the diacritic. In Portuguese orthography, there is no diacritic used for Ximenes.

Spelling

As the modern name Ximenes has an -es suffix, it is almost certainly of Portuguese, Galician or Old Spanish origin, as the orthographic change to -ez (and the consonant shift from X to J) was revised in Spain only in the late 18th century. This was not the case in Portugal.

Other languages in Castilian-dominated lands like Aragon, Asturias, Galicia, often retained the -es ending, and their descendants bear witness to this historical anomaly. In Catalonia, Valencia and the Balearics, the ending -is is used instead of -es (or -ez), hence, the spelling Ximenis (or the variant with vowel epenthesis, Eiximinis or Eximenis).

Ximenes is found most commonly in Portugal, and in all of the ex-Portuguese Crown territories, especially in Brazil. Bishop Carlos Filipe Ximenes Belo, Nobel Laureate from East Timor in 1996, and Brazilian actress Mariana Ximenes are prime examples of this historical difference.

Notable people

Jimenes  
Juan Isidro Jimenes Pereyra (1847–1919), President of the Dominican Republic

Jiménez or Jimenez
Alex Jimenez (born 1982), United States Army soldier missing in action in Iraq and Iran
Carmen Jiménez (1920–2016), Spanish artist
Carmita Jiménez (1944–2003), Puerto Rican singer
Celia Jiménez (chef), Spanish chef
César Jiménez (disambiguation), various people
Christian Jimenez (born 1986), American soccer player
Cláudia Jimenez (1958–2022), Brazilian actress and comedienne
Dany Jiménez (born 1993), Major League Baseball player
David Jimenez (disambiguation), various people
Eloy Jiménez (born 1996), Major League Baseball player
Elvio Jiménez (born 1940), Major League Baseball player
Emma Laura Gutiérrez Jiménez, Mexican actress 
Eustacio Jiménez (1976–2010), a Mexican professional wrestler better known as El Hijo de Cien Caras
Flaco Jiménez (born 1939), Mexican-American musician
Francisco Jiménez (governor) (born 1979), colonial Nahua noble from Tecamachalco
García Jiménez of Pamplona, ninth century Pamplona royalty
Iker Jiménez (born 1973), Spanish journalist
Jesús Jiménez Zamora, President of Costa Rica (1863–1866 and 1868–1870)
Joe Jiménez, Puerto Rican baseball player
Joe Jimenez, American golfer
José Jiménez (baseball) (born 1973), Major League Baseball player
José Alfredo Jiménez (1926–1973), Mexican singer-songwriter
José F. Jiménez (1946–1969), United States Marine Corps Medal of Honor recipient for heroism
José María Jiménez (1971–2003), Spanish cyclist
Joseph Jimenez, American business executive, former chairman of Novartis
Joyce Jimenez (born 1978), Filipino-American actress
Juan Leon Jimenez Molina (born 1953), Costa Rican chess master
Juan Ramón Jiménez (1881–1958), Spanish poet, Nobel Laureate

Luis Antonio Jiménez (born 1984), Chilean soccer player
Manny Jiménez (1936–2017), Major League Baseball player
Marcos Pérez Jiménez (1914–2001), President of Venezuela 1952–1958
Michele Jimenez, ballet dancer
Miguel Ángel Jiménez (born 1964), Spanish professional golfer
Omar Jimenez (born 1993), American broadcast journalist
Óscar Jiménez (disambiguation), several people
Pete Jimenez (1917–2006), American soldier in World War II
Phil Jimenez (contemporary), American comic book writer
Ramón Jiménez Gaona (born 1969), Paraguayan discus thrower
Raúl Jiménez (born 1991), Mexican football player
Ricardo Jiménez Oreamuno, son of Jesús Jiménez Zamora; President of Costa Rica (1910–1914, 1924–1928 and 1932–1936)
Roberto Jiménez (footballer, born 1983), Peruvian footballer
Roberto Jiménez (footballer, born 1986), Spanish footballer
Sérgio Jimenez (born 1984), Brazilian racing driver
Arvin Impuesto Jimenez(1974–2014), Filipino actor and radio personality known as Tado
Tony Jimenez, Spanish businessman and property developer
Matxin Jiménez Guerra, creador de la pagina undertime.es

Ximenes

Aurora Ximenes (born 1955), East Timorese politician
Carlos Filipe Ximenes Belo (born 1948), Roman Catholic Bishop of East Timor, Nobel laureate
Claudio de Jesus Ximenes (contemporary), Supreme Court Chief Justice of East Timor
David Ximenes (1777–1848) British Army officer, magistrate and landowner, younger brother of Morris Ximenes
Didacus Ximenes (died 1560), Spanish monk, theologian, rector of the University of Salamanca
Ettore Ximenes (1855–1926), Italian sculptor
Francisco Jiménez de Cisneros (1436–1517), Spanish Cardinal, inquisitor and statesman (called in his lifetime "Ximenes de Cisneros")
Júlio Ximenes Sênior (1901–1975), Brazilian scientist, author, and World War II Army general
Leonardo Ximenes (1716–1786), Italian mathematician, engineer, astronomer and geographer
Mariana Ximenes (born 1981), Brazilian actress
Moäng Ratu Dona Ines Ximenes da Silva of Flores (c. 1700), lady sovereign and member of the Portuguese Ximenes da Silva ruling family of the island-principality of Flores, in present-day Indonesia
Morris Ximenes (1762–1837), British Army officer and Berkshire landowner
Orion Ximenes Filho (born 1945), Brazilian actor, voice-over artist
Paulo César Ximenes (born 1943), Brazilian economist
Sebastiano Ximenes (c. late–16th century), Italian banker of Portuguese origin in Florence, patron of the arts
Vicente T. Ximenes (1919–2014), Mexican-American civil rights pioneer and politician
Ximenes, pseudonym of Derrick Somerset Macnutt (1902–1971), British crossword compiler

Eiximenis
Francesc Eiximenis (14th century), Franciscan Catalan writer

Fictional characters
José Jiménez (character), created by comedian Bill Dana
Colonel Jimenez, a corrupt officer in the San Theodoran military in the fictional work The Broken Ear, part of the Adventures of Tintin by Hergé
Marcelo Jimenez, in the 2014 survival horror game The Evil Within
Lori Jiménez, a child character from the anime series Transformers: Cybertron
Jim Jimenez, a pirate on the on the television series Our Flag Means Death

Ruling dynasty
The Jiménez dynasty is a name sometimes given a dynasty that in 905 became kings of Pamplona, eventually expanding their control to most of Christian Iberia.

References

External links
Meaning & Origin of the Portuguese "Ximenes"
 Historical information on one Ximenes family in Britain

Basque-language surnames
Patronymic surnames
Spanish-language surnames
Surnames of Colombian origin